The Truth is a UK based Asian rapper.

Biography 
Truth first came on the scene at the age of 13-14 by sculpting the underground urban market and artists alike. From hosting college radio shows, to setting up local pirate stations with freestyles and fights, The Truth slowly built a reputation that saw them take the stage with artists such as Donaeo and Lady Sovereign, who only played their part. The musical journey was just beginning.

Seeing the success of the same artists that he had shared the stage with, The Truth set off on an entrepreneurial musical path that would lead to heights that he would not have imagined himself. After leaving aside the radio stations and rave scene, The Truth became part of a four-man MC group that served to further his thirst for stardom even more by taking his music to the next level. From recording in a computer room to lacing his imperious vocals in a fully equipped studio in the heart of London, The Truth saw progression that could be built upon, however only with the sacrifice of leaving the group and becoming a solo artist alongside the producer of the group Bobby Wonda.

It was at this point, after having taken a break from music and earning a fully certified Law Degree, that The Truth had the creative freedom to search deep within his own soul and create the music that he had always envisaged to break barriers and propel himself to greatness. The music had now become formulated yet liberated; it was now commercialised yet bespoke; all signs of the evolution that had changed a rave MC into an artist with a brand, a story to tell, and the material to push all elements combined as, The Truth.

From The Truth's debut single "Kya Karoon" (2010) to his follow-up "Sharabi" (2010), The Truth has performed at Wembley Stadium for the Asian Achievers Awards 2010, BBC Maida Vale Studios 2011, and Glastonbury 2011. To follow up from there, The Truth's latest single, "I Make 'Em Say" (2011) has been playlisted on BBC Radio 1.

He has featured on BBC Radio 1, BBC Asian Network, Wembley Stadium, BBC Maida Vale, and Glastonbury 2011. On 1 October 2011, The Truth won Best Urban Act at the Brit Asia Awards 2011, making this his first award, from his first nomination.

Singles 
 "Brown Butterfly" (produced by Bobby Wonda) 2009
 "Kya Karoon" (produced by Bobby Wonda) 2010
 "Sharabi" (produced by Mentor Beats) 2010
 "Mike Lowery Freestyle" (produced by Skepta 2011)
 "Sheila Ki Jawani" (Friction Lab Remix with Bobby Wonda) 2011
 "Jaan Jayegi" (produced by Bobby Wonda) 2011
 "I Make 'Em Say" (produced by Pinju) 2011

References

External links 
 
The Truth BBC Artist Page
Urban Desi Radio talks about The Truth
BBC Blog - The Truth

Year of birth missing (living people)
Living people
British male rappers